"He Ain't Heavy, He's My Brother" is a 1969 song by the band the Hollies.

He Ain't Heavy, He's My Brother may also refer to:
 He Ain't Heavy, He's My Brother (album), a 1969 Hollies album, also known as Hollies Sing Hollies and including the song of the same name
 He Ain't Heavy, He's My Brother (film), a Hong Kong film, also known as He Ain't Heavy, He's My Father or 新難兄難弟
 "He Ain't Heavy, He's My Brother", an episode of Rizzoli & Isles
 "He Ain't Heavy, He's My Brother", an episode of On Our Own (1994 TV series)
 The caption of a logo adopted by Boys Town in 1943

See also 
 He Ain't Heavy (disambiguation)
 He's No Heavy, He's My Brother (disambiguation)
 He's Heavy, He's My Brother (disambiguation)
 He Ain't Heavy, He's My Father (disambiguation)
 "He Ain't a Hottie, He's My Brother", an episode of Hannah Montana
 "He Ain't Heavy, He's My Bother", an episode of Heathcliff (1984 TV series)
 "He Ain't Heavy, He's Dee's Brother", an episode of Moesha
 "He Ain't Heavy, He's Willie's Brother", an episode of ALF
 "Lee Ain't Heavy, He's My Brother", an episode of Three's Company